The 1958 Ukrainian Cup was a football knockout competition conducting by the Football Federation of the Ukrainian SSR and was known as the Ukrainian Cup.

Teams

Tournament distribution 
The competition was conducted among 21 clubs out of 80 participants of the 1958 Football Championship and 7 other non-"teams of masters" FC Uzyn, Shakhta Holubivka Kadiivka, Spartak Shopla, FC KremHESbud, Budivelnyk Mykolaiv, Avanhard Pryluky, Metalist Sevastopol.

Non-participating "teams of masters" 
The Ukrainian teams of masters did not take part in the competition.
 1958 Soviet Class A: FC Dynamo Kyiv, FC Shakhtar Stalino
 1958 Soviet Class B: SKVO Odessa, FC Avanhard Mykolaiv, FC Spartak Kherson, FC Zirka Kirovohrad, SKCF Sevastopol, FC Metalurh Zaporizhia, FC Trudovi Rezervy Luhansk, FC Kolhospnyk Poltava, FC Metalurh Dnipropetrovsk, FC Avanhard Kharkiv, FC Kolhospnyk Cherkasy, FC Khimik Dniprodzerzhynsk, FC Avanhard Simferopol, SKVO Lvov, FC Lokomotyv Vinnytsia, FC Spartak Uzhhorod, FC Spartak Stanislav, SKVO Kiev, FC Pischevik Odesa, FC Avanhard Rivno, FC Lokomotyv Stalino, FC Shakhtar Kadiivka

Competition schedule

First elimination round

Second elimination round 
Byes: Avanhard Ternopil, Avanhard Lviv, Mashynobudivnyk Zaporizhia, Metalist Sevastopol

Quarterfinals

Semifinals 

Replay

Final 

The final was held in Ternopil.

Top goalscorers

See also 
 Soviet Cup
 Ukrainian Cup

Notes

References

External links 
 Information source 
 The 1958 Cup of the UkrSSR (1958. Кубок УССР). Luhansk Our Football.

1958
Cup
1958 domestic association football cups